Eli Lundy Huggins (August 1, 1842 – October 22, 1929) was a US Army officer who received the Medal of Honor for his actions during the Indian Wars. He was born in Schuyler County, Illinois, and died in San Diego.

After briefly attending Hamline University, Huggins dropped out and enlisted as a private in the 2nd Minnesota Volunteer Infantry in July 1861. He was promoted to corporal in 1862, and was captured at the Battle of Chickamauga, but released the following year. In March 1865, he was commissioned first lieutenant in the 1st Minnesota Heavy Artillery Regiment, before mustering out the following September.

Thanks to a recommendation by congressman William Windom, Huggins was commissioned as a second lieutenant of the 2nd Artillery Regiment in February 1866, and regained his wartime rank by the end of the year. While in the army, he attended Mankato Normal School now  called Minnesota State University, Mankato from 1872 to 1875. He was then promoted to captain of the 2nd Cavalry Regiment in April 1879. In October 1882 he was assigned as Assistant Inspector General in the Department of the Columbia. He was promoted to major in January 1897, and served as aide-de-camp to general Nelson A. Miles until Miles' appointment as Commanding General of the Army.

At the outbreak of the Spanish–American War, Huggins was appointed colonel of the 8th US Volunteer Infantry in May 1898. After the war he reverted to his pre-war rank and served with the 6th US Cavalry in the Boxer Rebellion. He was again promoted to colonel in November 1901 and received command of his old regiment, the 2nd Cavalry. He was finally promoted to brigadier general on February 22, 1903, and retired the next day.

Following his retirement, Huggins became a real-estate investor in the Indian Territory. He was buried at Mountain View Cemetery in Oakland, California.

Medal of Honor citation
Rank and organization: Captain, 2nd U.S. Cavalry. Place and date: Near O'Fallons, Mont., April 1, 1880. Entered service at: Minnesota. Birth: Schuyler County, Ill. Date of issue: November 27, 1894.

Surprised the Indians in their strong position and fought them until dark with great boldness.

References

 Historical Register and Dictionary of the US Army
 Biography

External links
 

1842 births
1929 deaths
United States Army Medal of Honor recipients
Union Army soldiers
American Indian Wars recipients of the Medal of Honor
Hamline University School of Law alumni
People from Schuyler County, Illinois
United States Army generals
Minnesota State University, Mankato alumni
Burials at Mountain View Cemetery (Oakland, California)
Military personnel from Illinois